Edino Nazareth Filho (born 5 June 1955), known as Edinho, is a Brazilian former football player and manager. He played as a central defender with Fluminense, Grêmio, Toronto Blizzard and with the Brazil national team. He is currently a sports commentator.

International career
Edinho obtained 45 caps with the Brazil national team between March 1977 and June 1986. He took part at three "FIFA World Cup" final tournament.

He played 3 matches in the 1978 FIFA World Cup, in Argentina. He appeared only once during the 1982 FIFA World Cup, subbing in for Oscar after 75 minutes against New Zealand. He played all Brazil's five matches during the 1986 FIFA World Cup in which he was captain, scoring one goal.

Edinho was also in the team which finished fourth in football at the 1976 Summer Olympics and won a gold medal in football at the 1975 Pan American Games.

After retiring and past the age of 40, he made a career at beach soccer. He was part of the winning Brazilian team on the first 3 Beach Soccer World Championships in 1995, 1996 and 1997. He was selected as the best player from the 1996 tournament.

Honours

Player
Brazil
 Pan-American Games: 1975

Fluminense
 Campeonato Carioca: 1975, 1976, 1980

Flamengo
 Campeonato Brasileiro: 1987

Grêmio
 Campeonato Gaúcho: 1989
 Copa do Brasil: 1989

Manager
Fluminense
 Taça Guanabara: 1991, 1993

Vitória-BA
 Campeonato Baiano: 1996, 2002
 Copa Centro-Oeste: 2002

Brasiliense
 Campeonato Brasileiro Série B: 2004

References

External links
 
 
 
 
 

1955 births
Brazilian footballers
Serie A players
Campeonato Brasileiro Série A players
Footballers at the 1976 Summer Olympics
Olympic footballers of Brazil
1978 FIFA World Cup players
1982 FIFA World Cup players
1986 FIFA World Cup players
1979 Copa América players
Living people
Footballers from Rio de Janeiro (city)
Brazil international footballers
Brazilian expatriate footballers
Expatriate footballers in Italy
Brazilian football managers
Brazilian expatriate football managers
Expatriate football managers in Portugal
Campeonato Brasileiro Série A managers
Campeonato Brasileiro Série B managers
Primeira Liga managers
Fluminense FC players
Udinese Calcio players
CR Flamengo footballers
Grêmio Foot-Ball Porto Alegrense players
Brazilian beach soccer players
Fluminense FC managers
Botafogo de Futebol e Regatas managers
C.S. Marítimo managers
CR Flamengo managers
Esporte Clube Vitória managers
Associação Portuguesa de Desportos managers
Grêmio Foot-Ball Porto Alegrense managers
Goiás Esporte Clube managers
Esporte Clube Bahia managers
Brasiliense Futebol Clube managers
Club Athletico Paranaense managers
Sport Club do Recife managers
Boavista Sport Club managers
Joinville Esporte Clube managers
Guaratinguetá Futebol managers
Association football defenders
Pan American Games medalists in football
Pan American Games gold medalists for Brazil
Footballers at the 1975 Pan American Games
Medalists at the 1975 Pan American Games
Brazilian expatriate sportspeople in Italy
Brazilian expatriate sportspeople in Portugal
Expatriate soccer players in Canada
Brazilian expatriate sportspeople in Canada
Toronto Blizzard (1986–1993) players
Canadian Soccer League (1987–1992) players